Ifumbo is an administrative ward in the Chunya district of the Mbeya Region of Tanzania. In 2016 the Tanzania National Bureau of Statistics report there were 7,209 people in the ward, from 6,541 in 2012.

Villages / vitongoji 
The ward has 2 villages and 10 vitongoji.

 Ifumbo
 Chikula
 Ihango
 Itete
 Majengo
 Mbuyuni
 Mwambagala
 Sawa A
 Lupamarket
 Kasanga
 Lupamarket
 Mabomba

References 

Wards of Mbeya Region